The 2018–19 Arkansas–Pine Bluff Golden Lions men's basketball team represents the University of Arkansas at Pine Bluff during the 2018–19 NCAA Division I men's basketball season. The Golden Lions, led by 11th-year head coach George Ivory, play their home games at the K. L. Johnson Complex as members of the Southwestern Athletic Conference.

Previous season
The Golden Lions finished the 2017–18 season 14–21, 12–6 in SWAC play to finish in a three-way tie for second place. Due to Grambling State's Academic Progress Rate violations and subsequent postseason ineligibility, the Golden Lions received the No. 1 seed in the SWAC tournament. They defeated Mississippi Valley State and Southern before losing to Texas Southern in the tournament championship.

Roster

Schedule and results
 
|-
!colspan=9 style=| Non-conference regular season

|-
!colspan=9 style=| SWAC regular season

|-
!colspan=9 style=| SWAC tournament

References

Arkansas–Pine Bluff Golden Lions men's basketball seasons
Arkansas-Pine Bluff
Gold
Gold